South Lima is a hamlet and census-designated place (CDP) in Livingston County, New York, United States. Its population was 240 as of the 2010 census. South Lima had a post office from January 10, 1854, until April 17, 2010; it still has its own ZIP code, 14558.

Geography
South Lima is in northeastern Livingston County, along the boundaries between the towns of Lima, Livonia, and Avon. South Lima Road, the main street through the community, forms the Lima/Livonia town line, and Garden Street, which enters from the north, forms the Lima/Avon line. The South Lima CDP extends west to Bronson Hill Road and east to Poplar Hill Road.

It is in the valley of Little Conesus Creek, which flows north and west to Conesus Creek and is part of the Genesee River watershed.

Demographics

References

Hamlets in Livingston County, New York
Hamlets in New York (state)
Census-designated places in Livingston County, New York
Census-designated places in New York (state)